Qullpapata (Quechua qullpa salty, saltpeter, pata elevated place; above, at the top; edge; bank (of a river), shore, Hispanicized spelling Cullpapata) is a  mountain in the Andes of Peru. It is situated in the Huancavelica Region, Huancavelica Province, Acobambilla District. Qullpapata lies west of Warmiqucha, one of the largest lakes of Peru, and south of Milluqucha.

References

Mountains of Huancavelica Region
Mountains of Peru